James Finnegan may refer to:

 James Finnegan (American football) (1901–1967), American football player
 James Finnegan (poet), Irish writer
 James A. Finnegan (1906–1958), American politician from Philadelphia, Pennsylvania
 James E. Finnegan (1892–1966), American politician in Wisconsin